Hip Hop for Respect is a 2000 project which released one EP for Rawkus Records.  It was organized by Mos Def and Talib Kweli to speak out against police brutality in general, and the case of Amadou Diallo in particular.

History
Amadou Diallo had been shot and killed by the New York City Police Department the previous year when he attempted to retrieve his wallet and the police fired 41 shots at the unarmed man, so the subject of police brutality was prevalent.

The project aimed to assemble 41 emcees to represent the 41 shots. Rappers featured on the EP include Kool G Rap, Rah Digga, Sporty Thievz, Shabaam Sahdeeq, Common, Pharoahe Monch, Posdnous, Dante and Main Flow of Mood, Nine, Tiye Phoenix, Breezly Brewin' of Juggaknots, Punchline, Imani Uzuri, EL-P and Mr. Len of Company Flow, Aesop Rock, Jah Born of Medina Green, What? What?, John Forté, Fre, J-Live, Rubix, Invincible, Wordsworth, A.L., Kofi Taha, Tame One, Jane Doe, Grafh, Shyheim, Channel Live, Wise Intelligent, Crunch Lo, Rock of Heltah Skeltah, Nonchalant, Ras Kass, Dead Prez, and Parrish Smith.

Producers included Mr. Khaliyl, Organized Noize, and 88-Keys.

Charts
The EP's single "One Four Love Pt. 1" managed to reach several charts:
2000: "One Four Love Pt. 1": Canadian Singles Chart	 6
2000: "One Four Love Pt. 1": Hot R&B/Hip-Hop Singles & Tracks	 55
2000: "One Four Love Pt. 1": Hot Rap Singles

Track listing
"Intro"
"One Four Love (Part 1)"
"Protective Custody"
"A Tree Never Grown"
"One Four Love (Part 2)"
"One Four Love (Instrumental)"
"Protective Custody (Instrumental)"
"A Tree Never Grown (Instrumental)"

References

External links
 [ Hip Hop for Respect (album)] at AllMusic
 Hip Hop for Respect at Discogs

American hip hop groups
Hip hop supergroups
Albums produced by Organized Noize
2000 EPs
Rawkus Records EPs
Musical groups established in 2000